Signal Port (also, Hardscratch and Signal) is a former settlement in Mendocino County, California.

The Signal post office operated for a time in 1882. The Signal Port post office operated from 1888 to 1890. The name refers to signals given ships waiting to load lumber at the site.

References

Former settlements in Mendocino County, California
Former populated places in California